Marcel Amont (born Marcel Jean-Pierre Balthazar Miramon ; 1 April 1929 – 8 March 2023) was a French singer and actor of the 1960s and 1970s. Amont also recorded in Occitan and promoted Bearn culture from the 1950s.

Amont was one of the most popular singers in France, and the most prolific of the French language with many years of career. He sold 300 million albums, recorded 30 albums, 79 singles 126 ep's, 11 compilations and about 1,000 songs in different languages (English, Italian, Portuguese, Chinese, German, Irish and Spanish).

Amont is known for having performed songs by composers such as Georges Brassens, Léo Ferré and Georges Moustaki. Inspired by American pop and jazz in the style of Frank Sinatra, Tony Bennett and Andy Williams. He recorded international hits such as "Blue, bland, blond", "L'amour ça fait passer le temps", "Ballade pour l'espagnol", "Le plus beau tango du monde" and "Cathy, fais-moi danser". His famous song entitled "Un Mexicain" reached number 1 on the charts in France. He also made films and was director of soundtracks.

First years
Born in Bordeaux on 1 April 1929, son of Modeste Miramon, employee of the railways, and Romélie Lamazou, nurse. He doubted, after the baccalaureate, between the chair of physical education and the Conservatory of dramatic art. The comedy, and finally the song, will prevail over the sport. After having toured the arts of Bordeaux, he "got up" in Paris in the late 1950s, where he made his name little by little in most cabarets of the two banks (Villa d'Este, Fontaine des 4 saisons, etc. ). From a young age he was fond of jazz and pop music.

Beginnings
In 1951, Marcel Amont decided to try his luck in Paris and became famous performing in several cabarets. For many years, Marcel Upstream enchainer such benefits before 1956 to secure the first parts of Edith Piaf, allowing it to quickly become the revelation of the year and his first public recording, which allows him to get the novel Grand Prix de Novela the French Academy of Charles Cros. A success that opens the doors of the cinema, and will become with Brigitte Bardot in The bride is too beautiful.

1956 is the miraculous year. At the Olympia, he was cut in the first part of Edith Piaf: first hired as a "supplement to the program," a sacred "revelation of the year" and finished five weeks later in second place on the poster. Encouraged by this success in public, he recorded his first album in public and receives the Price of the Académie Charles-Cros in the company of Serge Gainsbourg and Juliette Gréco and, in the process, debut in the cinema with Brigitte Bardot in the bride is too beautiful. We often see Marcel Amont in the famous television show 36 chandelles.

Through his appearances in the films La mariée est trop belle (1956), together with Brigitte Bardot and La conduite à gauche (1961), Marcel acquires a great reputation in France.

Amont signed a record contract with Polydor Records in that same year when he released his first single Escamillo. In 1957 he released his first album entitled Marcel Amont and in Bleu, Blanc, Blond.

A revelation of the late 1950s, Marcel Upstream connects more than 100 dates in 1962 on the stage of Bobino and two albums: Tout doux tout doucement (1959) and Bleu blanc blond (1959).

International career
At the beginning of the 1960s, Amont would develop a prolific career getting more than 5 gold albums and achieve successes such as «Les Bleuets d'Azur» and «Le balayeur du roy». He also recorded his success which was sold in 80 million copies «Dans le coeur de ma blonde» in 1961.

The following year he popularized the song composed by Charles Aznavour, "Un mexicain" which also reached number one in France. From that moment on, the public knew him as the most prolific singer in the Francophone world, although he was behind Charles Aznavour and Gilbert Bécaud.

In that same year in 1962, he offered his first solo exhibition to Bobino for 3 and a half months, he sold out; In addition to his own texts, he creates several songs signed by Claude Nougaro (Le Balayeur du Roy, Penholder, Tango of Twins, Le Jazz et la Java). He made his first tour in 1963 in Luxembourg in concert. Immediately released another album Fantaisie Sur Des Airs D 'Opérettes with 14 songs.

In 1965, he returned to Olympia for five weeks. Very noticeable innovation: in its staging, it evolved around it with dancers. He would continue to record 45rpm records until 1969. On 1 October 1967, he hosted the first color television show in the history of French television (Amont Tour).

Success
In the 1970s he changed his record label CBS Records and released his first album titled Amont-Tour. In 1970, at the Olympia, always in the company of his dancers and choristers, he surrounds himself with specialists and uses giant screens for certain staging. The success is such that the show lasts 5 weeks. Then he embodies the dynamic, smiling and light young singer, the scenic and popular repertoire. He is preparing a musical and, for this reason, rejects the offers of a US producer and the BBC.

It comes out with another North American version entitled "Can't Take My Eyes Off You" and in French called "Femme jolie on te yeux", the French version was composed by himself since he was also a songwriter. He participated in numerous variety shows in the 60s and 70s, especially those of Maritie and Gilbert Carpentier. In 1974, he is the host of the Sunday show Toutankhamont.

The following year Amont released another success that was sold in 50 million copies entitled "L'amour ça fait passer le temps" in 1971.

Like many leading artists of the 1960s and 1970s, the 1980s are hard on the French media plan, but for more than two decades, the very visual nature of their art opened the doors to the outdoors (touring Japan, Russia, recital at the Gould Foundation of San Francisco, Studio One in Rome for one year, etc.).

Amont puts to the music two texts by Georges Brassens (A Little Eva in excess, The Old Fossil), which he had awarded in 1976 «Le chapeau de Mireille».

Consecration
In 1980, he was part of the candidates for the French preselection for the Eurovision Song Contest with the song Camarade Vigneron. On 23 March, during the final pre-selection in TF1, presented by Évelyne Dhéliat, occupies the 4th place of 6 candidates following the votes of the spectators.

In the French plan, he finds a new life in the 2000s and in 2006, he returns with a new album time difference between Francis Dreyfus, the duets signature with Agnès Jaoui, Gérard Darmon, Didier Lockwood, Bireli Lagrené.

In 2007, he found Olympia, 50 years after his first visit.

At the end of 2008, he participated in the children's album by Guillaume Aldebert titled Enfantillages.

For two years, he is one of the stars of the Tender Age tour, the idol tour for seasons 3 and 4. In October 2009, he celebrated his 80th birthday with a series of recitals in the Grand Comedy in Paris.

In 2010, he participated in the album for children of Emma Daumas Les Larmes de Crodrilo, writing several texts and singing a duet with elle, about music by his son Mathias Miramon.

In 2012, after the publication of a memoir entitled At the time passes Boulevard (Editions Pirot), he published "Nevó", an illustrated picture book comes mainly from his personal albums (Editions Didier Carpentier). He returns to Paris at the Alhambra on 25 November to celebrate his more than 60-year career. It offers an animated and surprisingly modern show, between stand-up and singing, in an alloy of hits known by the general public, small scenic masterpieces and more recent titles, which delight his loyal public and a new generation of spectators. In 2013, his song Il has the yellow jersey appearing on the soundtrack of the film La Grande Boucle directed by Laurent Tuel.

The same year, he participated in the video "Because the night", a song by the collective Les Marguerites against Alzheimer, destined to fight against the disease.

In January 2014, Marianne Melodie / Universal Music released a double anthology CD (success from 1959 to 1975).

Later life and death
In March 2014, he published his seventh book, Letter to Friends, which collects fictitious letters sent to the people he loves and most of whom he has met. Among the recipients: Charles Aznavour, Maurice Chevalier, Yves Montand, Alain Souchon, François Morel, and Antoine de Caunes, among others.

Amont published an autobiography in 2015.

From November 2016 to February 2017, he participated in the tenth anniversary of "Age tend, the tour of idols", together with Gérard Lenorman, Sheila, Hugues Aufray, among others.

In 2018, the stand-up begins with a new show "Marcel says and sings Amont", in which he trusts in the manner of a humorist, tracing his life from his native southwest until today. He is enamoured of his greatest hits and new songs, whether or not they are yours and that enhance the story.

Marcel Amont married Tamara Vladimirovna Deiness in 1952 and divorced in 1959; He had three children, Pascual, Jean and Pierre. Amont died in Saint-Cloud on 8 March 2023, at the age of 93.

Legacy
Amont is also known for being the first French singer to perform in Béarnese after releasing his album Que canta en biarnés, in 1979.

Amont was honored in 2001 with the title of Knight of the Legion of Honour.

In 2017 he celebrated 65 years of artistic career, he continued to give concerts with sold out localities and selling records. Sales exceed 35 million copies, making him the third best-selling French singer in the country's music history, behind Michel Sardou and Johnny Hallyday.

Influence
Amont interpreted classical composer songs, including ones by:
 Boris Vian
 Guy Thomas
 Michelle Senlis
 Philippe Pauletto
 Guillaume Apollinaire
 Henri Gougaud
 Jacques Prévert

Selected discography

Albums studio
 1959 : Bleu, Blanc, Blond
 1961 : Dans Le Coeur De Ma Blonde
 1961 : Marcel Amont
 1962 : Récital 1962
 1962 : Un Mexicain
 1962 : Nos Chansons de Leurs 20 Ans
 1963 : Le Barbier De Seville
 1965 : Ah C'qu'on A Rigolé Dimanche
 1965 : Chansons Des Iles Et D'ailleurs
 1975 : Pourquoi Tu Chanterais Pas ?
 1979 : Un Autre Amont
 2006 : Décalage Horaire

Singles
 1956 : Escamillo (Georges Coulonges / C. Roi)
 1958 : Julie (J. Datin - M. Vidalin)
 1958 : Mon manège à moi (N. Glanzberg - J. Constantin)
 1959 : Tout doux, tout doucement (Gretchen Christopher - Pierre Delanoë)
 1959 : Bleu blanc blond (Jean Dréjac / H. Green)
 1960 : Les bleuets d'azur (J. Larue / G Magenta)
 1961 : Dans le cœur de ma blonde (Jean Dréjac / N. Petty)
 1961 : La chanson du grillon (The cricket song) (Jean Dréjac)
 1962 : Un Mexicain (J. Plante / Charles Aznavour)
 1963 : Moi le clown (J.Mareuil - Ch. Aznavour)
 1964 : Dans le cœur de ma blonde (Jean Dréjac)
 1965 : Maria et le pot au lait (M. Amont)
 1965 : Au bal de ma banlieue (Jean Dréjac)
 1970 : Le monsieur qui volait (Claude Nougaro / M. Amont ])
 1971 : L'amour ça fait passer le temps (Rivat - Thomas / Vincent)
 1971 : Monsieur (G. Thibault / J. Renard)
 1971 : Benjamin le Bienheureux ( Y. Dessca / E. Charden)
 1971 : C'est aujourd'hui dimanche  (Bernard Estardy - Jean-Michel Rivat / F. Thomas) 
 1974 : Y a toujours un peintre (JM. Rivat- R. Vincent)
 1974 : Le chapeau de Mireille (Georges Brassens)
 1975 : Les artistes  (M. Amont - J. Revaux / R. Vincent)
 1976 : La musique est de retour (M. Amont - M. Jourdan /Gustin)
 1977 : On ne guérit pas de son enfance (M. Amont / M. Cywie)
 1979 : Viennois (Alain Souchon)
 1979 : Paris rombière (Cavanna / R. Vincent)
 1979 : Pour traverser la rivière (Gilles Vigneault)
 1979 : La galère (Maxime Le Forestier / Julien Clerc)
 1982 : Demain j'arrête de fumer  (Amont)
 1985 : Le tam-tam des gorilles (45 tours pour enfants)
 1991 : Sympathiq''' (M. Amont)
 2006 : Démodé (M. Amont / P. Loffredo)
 2009 : Il a neigé (M. Amont / M. Miramon)

Mainly issued on Universal

Books written by Amont
 Une chanson, qu'y a-t-il à l'intérieur d'une chanson? (Seuil, 1989)
 Ça se dit, ça s'écrit, ça se chante (Éd. Christian Pirot, 2000)
 Comment peut-on être gascon ? (Éd. Atlantica, 2001)
 Les plus belles chansons de Gascogne (Éd. Sud Ouest, 2006)
 Sur le boulevard du temps qui passe (Éd. Christian Pirot, 2009)
 Il a neigé (Éd. Didier Carpentier, 2012)
 Lettres à des amis'' (Éd. Chiflet & Cie, 2014)

References

External links
  Official site
 
 

1929 births
2023 deaths
Musicians from Bordeaux
20th-century French male singers
Chevaliers of the Légion d'honneur
Commandeurs of the Ordre des Arts et des Lettres
21st-century French male singers